Sam Morris Russell (August 9, 1889 – October 19, 1971) was a U.S. Representative from Texas.

Born on a farm near Stephenville, Texas, Russell attended the rural schools and the John Tarleton Agricultural College, Stephenville, Texas. He taught school in Erath County, Texas from 1913 to 1918. He also engaged in agricultural pursuits. During the First World War, he served as a private in the Forty-sixth Machine Gun Company, United States Army, in 1918 and 1919. He studied law, was admitted to the bar in 1919, and commenced practice in Stephenville, Texas. He served as county attorney of Erath County, Texas from 1919 to 1924. He served as district attorney of the Twenty-ninth Judicial District 1924–1928. He served as judge of the twenty-ninth judicial district 1928–1940.

Russell was elected as a Democrat to the Seventy-seventh and to the two succeeding Congresses (January 3, 1941 – January 3, 1947). He was not a candidate for renomination in 1946 to the Eightieth Congress. He resumed the practice of law, and served as Democratic county chairman from 1953 to 1955. He resided in Stephenville, Texas, until his death there October 19, 1971. He was interred in East Memorial Cemetery.

Sources

External links 
 

1889 births
1971 deaths
People from Stephenville, Texas
Tarleton State University alumni
Texas lawyers
Texas state court judges
United States Army soldiers
Democratic Party members of the United States House of Representatives from Texas
20th-century American judges
20th-century American politicians
20th-century American lawyers